Alwin Lopez Jarreau (March 12, 1940 – February 12, 2017) was an American singer and musician. His 1981 album Breakin' Away spent two years on the Billboard 200 and is considered one of the finest examples of the Los Angeles pop and R&B sound. The album won Jarreau the 1982 Grammy for Best Male Pop Vocal Performance. In all, he won seven Grammy Awards and was nominated for over a dozen more during his career.

Jarreau also sang the theme song of the 1980s television series Moonlighting, and was among the performers on the 1985 charity song "We Are the World."

Early life and career

Jarreau was born in Milwaukee, Wisconsin, on March 12, 1940, the fifth of six children. His father Emile Alphonse Jarreau was a Seventh-day Adventist Church minister and singer, and his mother Pearl (Walker) Jarreau was a church pianist. Jarreau and his family sang together in church concerts and in benefits, and Jarreau and his mother performed at PTA meetings.

Jarreau was student council president and Badger Boys State delegate for Lincoln High School. At Boys State, he was elected governor. Jarreau went on to attend Ripon College, where he also sang with a group called the Indigos. He graduated in 1962 with a Bachelor of Science degree in psychology. Two years later, in 1964, he earned a master's degree in vocational rehabilitation from the University of Iowa. Jarreau also worked as a rehabilitation counselor in San Francisco, and moonlighted with a jazz trio headed by George Duke. In 1967, he joined forces with acoustic guitarist Julio Martinez. The duo became the star attraction at a small Sausalito night club called Gatsby's. This success contributed to Jarreau's decision to make professional singing his life and full-time career.

Career

In 1968, Jarreau made jazz his primary occupation. In 1969, he and Martinez headed south, where Jarreau appeared at Dino's, The Troubadour, and Bitter End West. Television exposure came from Johnny Carson, Mike Douglas, Merv Griffin, Dinah Shore, and David Frost. He expanded his nightclub appearances, performing at The Improv between the acts of such rising stars as Bette Midler, Jimmie Walker, and John Belushi. During this period, he became involved with the United Church of Religious Science and the Church of Scientology. Also, roughly at the same time, he began writing his own lyrics, finding that his Christian spirituality began to influence his work.

In 1975, Jarreau was working with pianist Tom Canning when he was spotted by Warner Bros. Records. Soon he released his critically acclaimed debut album, We Got By, which catapulted him to international fame and won an Echo Award (the German equivalent of the Grammys in the United States). On Valentine's Day 1976 he sang on the 13th episode of NBC's Saturday Night Live, that week hosted by Peter Boyle. A second Echo Award would follow with the release of his second album, Glow. In 1978, he won his first Grammy Award for Best Jazz Vocal Performance for his album, Look to the Rainbow.

One of Jarreau's most commercially successful albums is Breakin' Away (1981), which includes the hit song "We're in This Love Together". He won the 1982 Grammy Award for Best Male Pop Vocal Performance for Breakin' Away. In 1983 he released Jarreau. It was his third consecutive #1 album on the Billboard Jazz charts, while also placing at #4 on the R&B album charts and #13 on the Billboard 200. The album contained three hit singles:  "Mornin'" (U.S. Pop #21, AC #2 for three weeks), "Boogie Down" (U.S. Pop #77) and "Trouble in Paradise" (U.S. Pop #63, AC #10). In 1984 the album received four Grammy Award nominations, including for Jay Graydon as Producer of the Year (Non-Classical).

In 1984, his single "After All" reached 69 on the US Hot 100 chart and number 26 on the R&B chart. His last big hit was the Grammy-nominated theme to the 1980s American television show Moonlighting, for which he wrote the lyrics. Among other things, he was well known for his extensive use of scat singing (for which he was called "Acrobat of Scat"), and vocal percussion. He was also a featured vocalist on USA for Africa's "We Are the World" in which he sang the line, "...and so we all must lend a helping hand." Another charitable media event, HBO's Comic Relief, featured him in a duet with Natalie Cole singing the song "Mr. President", written by Joe Sterling, Mike Loveless, and Ray Reach.

Jarreau took an extended break from recording in the 1990s. As he explained in an interview with Jazz Review: "I was still touring, in fact, I toured more than I ever had in the past, so I kept in touch with my audience. I got my symphony program under way, which included my music and that of other people too, and I performed on the Broadway production of Grease. I was busier than ever! For the most part, I was doing what I have always done...perform live. I was shopping for a record deal and was letting people know that there is a new album coming. I was just waiting for the right label (Verve), but I toured more than ever." In 2003, Jarreau and conductor Larry Baird collaborated on symphony shows around the United States, with Baird arranging additional orchestral material for Jarreau's shows.

Jarreau toured and performed with Joe Sample, Chick Corea, Kathleen Battle, Miles Davis, George Duke, David Sanborn Rick Braun, and George Benson. He also performed the role of the Teen Angel in a 1996 Broadway production of Grease. On March 6, 2001, he received a star on the Hollywood Walk of Fame, at 7083 Hollywood Boulevard on the corner of Hollywood Boulevard and La Brea Avenue. In 2006, Jarreau appeared in a duet with American Idol finalist Paris Bennett during the Season 5 finale and on Celebrity Duets singing with actor Cheech Marin. In 2009, children's author Carmen Rubin published the story Ashti Meets Birdman Al, inspired by Jarreau's music. In 2010, Jarreau was a guest on a Eumir Deodato album, with the song "Double Face" written by Jarreau, Deodato, and Nicolosi. The song was produced by the Italian company Nicolosi Productions. On February 16, 2012, Jarreau was invited to the famous Italian Festival di Sanremo to sing with the Italian group Matia Bazar.

Personal life
Jarreau was married twice. Jarreau and Phyllis Hall were married from 1964 until their divorce in 1968. Jarreau married his second wife  in 1977. Jarreau and Player had a son, Ryan Jarreau. Ryan and Susan Jarreau appear as background vocalists on Tomorrow Today. Susan provided photography for several of Jarreau's albums, including Glow, All Fly Home, This Time, and Breakin' Away. She is the subject of "Susan's Song", track no. 3 on We Got By.

Illness and death
It was reported on July 23, 2010, that Jarreau was critically ill at a hospital in France, after performing in Barcelonnette, and was being treated for respiratory problems and cardiac arrhythmias. He was conscious, in a stable condition and in the cardiology unit of La Timone hospital in Marseille, the Marseille Hospital Authority said, and he remained there for about a week for tests.

In June 2012, Jarreau was diagnosed with pneumonia, which caused him to cancel several concerts in France. Jarreau made a full recovery and continued to tour extensively for the next five years until February 2017.

On February 8, 2017, after being hospitalized for exhaustion in Los Angeles, Jarreau canceled his remaining 2017 tour dates. On that date, the Montreux Jazz Academy, part of the Montreux Jazz Festival in Switzerland, announced that Jarreau would not return as a mentor to ten young artists, as he had done in 2015.

Jarreau died of respiratory failure, at the age of 76 on February 12, just two days after announcing his retirement, and one month before his 77th birthday.

He is interred in Forest Lawn Memorial Park (Hollywood Hills). His headstone features lyrics from his song " Mornin' ": "Like any man/I can reach out my hand/And touch the face of God".

Discography

We Got By (1975)
Glow (1976)
All Fly Home (1978)
This Time (1980)
Breakin' Away (1981)
1965 (1982)
Jarreau (1983)
High Crime (1984)
L Is for Lover (1986)
Heart's Horizon (1988)
Heaven and Earth (1992)
Tomorrow Today (2000)
All I Got (2002)
Accentuate the Positive (2004)
Givin' It Up (2006)
Christmas (2008)
My Old Friend: Celebrating George Duke (2014)

Awards and nominations

Grammy Awards

Hall of Fame

Honorary degrees

Academic degrees

Other honors
On October 17, 1982, at the invitation of the Milwaukee Brewers, he sang the National Anthem at Game 5 of the 1982 World Series.

References

External links

 
 
 Al Jarreau – Artist – grammy.com

1940 births
2017 deaths
American jazz singers
Crossover jazz singers
Grammy Award winners
Singers from Wisconsin
Musicians from Milwaukee
American rhythm and blues singers
Ripon College (Wisconsin) alumni
Ripon Red Hawks baseball players
Ripon Red Hawks men's basketball players
Smooth jazz singers
University of Iowa alumni
Vocalese singers
Deaths from respiratory failure
Burials at Forest Lawn Memorial Park (Hollywood Hills)
American men's basketball players
20th-century African-American male singers
21st-century African-American male singers